Larry Kolic (born August 31, 1963) is a former American football linebacker. He played for the Miami Dolphins from 1986 to 1988.

References

1963 births
Living people
American football linebackers
Ohio State Buckeyes football players
Miami Dolphins players